Paulina Ligarska (born 9 April 1996) is a Polish athlete competing in combined events. She represented her country at the 2022 World Championships finishing tenth.

International competitions

Personal bests
Outdoor
200 metres – 24.65 (+1.5 m/s, Eugene 2022)
800 metres – 2:13.16 (Warsaw 2022)
100 metres hurdles – 13.93 (+1.9 m/s, Warsaw 2022)
High jump – 1.83 (Grosseto 2022)
Long jump – 6.10 (+0.6 m/s, Warsaw 2022)
Shot put – 14.62 (Warsaw 2022)
Javelin throw – 48.33 (Suwałki 2022)
Heptathlon – 6241 (Warsaw 2022)
Indoor
800 metres – 2:13.85 (Toruń 2022)
60 metres hurdles – 8.62 (Toruń 2021)
High jump – 1.86 (Toruń 2022)
Long jump – 6.14 (Toruń 2021)
Shot put – 14.35 (Spała 2021)
Pentathlon – 4593 (Toruń 2022)

References

1996 births
Living people
Polish heptathletes
People from Kędzierzyn-Koźle
20th-century Polish women
21st-century Polish women